Nazik Hariri (née Audi) is the widow of former Prime Minister of Lebanon Rafic Hariri. She married him in 1976. Nazik is of Palestinian origin.

She married twice. She has three children from her second spouse, Rafic Hariri, including Ayman, Fahd and Hind. Her daughter from her first marriage, Joumana, is the wife of businessman Nizar Dalloul who is the son of the Shia politician Mohsen Dalloul.

References

External links
 The World's Billionaires - #891 Nazek Hariri - Forbes

Year of birth missing (living people)
Living people
Nazik
Lebanese people of Palestinian descent